Grotz is a German language habitational surname for someone living by a pine forest. Notable people with the name include:
 Jennifer Grotz (1971), American poet and translator 
 Zac Grotz (1993), American professional baseball pitcher

References 

German-language surnames
German toponymic surnames